Dr. Prakash Sharan Mahat is the current spokesperson of Nepali Congress. He is former minister for foreign affairs of Nepal, assumed his office on 26 August 2016. Born in Nuwakot district of Nepal on 5 November 1959, Mahat has an active political career of more than three decades. He actively participated in democratic movement, conflict resolution, and the peace process of the country and is keen on advancing inclusive economic development agenda.

Biography 
Since 2002, Mahat was working as a member of the Central Executive Committee of the Nepali Congress, major Democratic Party of Nepal till 2021 when he lost election for the post of party general secretary in 14th general convention of Nepali Congress. He began his political career by being actively involved in the student politics from 1970s. From 1983 to 1987, he served as general secretary of Nepal Students’ Union. He was a Member of Action Committee on behalf of Nepali Congress during the People's Movement of 1990. He also served as a Member of Central Economic Policy Committee in the Nepali Congress from 1998 to 1999.

Mahat has served in the legislature and executive branches of Nepal in different periods in various capacities. He was a Member of Interim Legislative-Parliament from 2006 to 2008. He was a member of the 1st Constituent Assembly from May 2008 to May 2012 and also a member of the 2nd Constituent Assembly since November 2013.

He played a vital role in the Constitution drafting process as a member of the Constitution Drafting Committee of the 2nd Constituent Assembly, which has now been transformed into the Legislature-Parliament after the promulgation of Constitution of Nepal on 20 September 2015. He has also served in different parliamentary committees, including the State Affairs Committee as well as the Special Parliamentary Hearing Committee.

Mahat was Minister for Energy from 2010 to 2011. He was State Former Minister for Foreign Affairs from June 2004 to February 2005. He was also a member of National Planning Commission from April 2002 to October 2002 and an advisor to the prime minister of Nepal from September 2001 to May 2002.

He was Member Secretary of High Level Committee constituted by Nepal Government in 1999 for the Resolution of Maoist insurgency. Similarly from 2006 to June 2007, he served as Member of National Peace Committee, which was constituted for facilitating dialogue and helping government to work on peace deal and preparation of peace accord. He was also entrusted with the responsibility to negotiate with different agitating groups in Nepal as one of the members of Government Dialogue Team from August 2007 to June 2008.

A PhD in economics from Southern Illinois University at Corbondale, Illinois, US, Mahat also holds a degree of Master of Science in policy economics from University of Illinois at Urbana–Champaign and master's degree in economics from Tribhuwan University, Kathmandu.

He remains active in the academic field, contributing policy papers, research analyses and newspapers articles particularly on economic development, peace process and contemporary political development.

In his various official capacities, he has participated in several international conferences and summits as well as various bilateral, regional and multilateral meetings.

Mahat is married to Bina Mahat, and they have two children. He left the office in June 2017.

References

External links 
 Official Website Of Prakash Sharan Mahat 
 http://parliamentwatch.org.np/member/1291.htm

1959 births
Living people
Nepali Congress politicians from Bagmati Province
Government ministers of Nepal
Foreign Ministers of Nepal
Members of the 1st Nepalese Constituent Assembly
Members of the 2nd Nepalese Constituent Assembly
Nepal MPs 2022–present